Elizabeth Frances "Fannie" McKinney Hughey (August 4, 1857 - 1929) was a music teacher who developed the Color-Music method to teach music to children.

Early life
Elizabeth Frances "Fannie" McKinney was born on August 4, 1857, in Durban, South Africa, the daughter of Silas W. McKinney and Fanny Melissa Clark Nelson, foreign missionaries.

Some of her ancestors were among the early settlers in the colonies. One of these belonged to the company made interesting by Richard Mather's story of the voyage from Southampton, England, in the "James" in 1635. Thirteen of her ancestors fought in the French and Indian wars, and one, Samuel Chapin, also known as "Deacon Chapin," is an interesting figure in history and story, whose statue — the work of Augustus Saint-Gaudens, called "The Puritan" — is one of the conspicuous monuments in Springfield, Massachusetts. Two bronze copies of this may be found — one in the Dresden Gallery and the other in the Louvre, Paris, while a colossal statue of the same confronts the visitor on entering the Saint Louis Art Museum in Forest Park (St. Louis). 

The qualities of the New England pioneer mingle with those of the family of Hughey's father, who were prominent in Southern New York and Northern Virginia all through the life of the colonies, and the subsequent history of the United States. 

After the death of McKinney's mother in South Africa, her father was forced to return to his native land on account of the ill-health of his daughter, Fannie, and because of this urgent need, boarded the first vessel coming into port. This was a freight vessel, with a prize cargo of saltpetre for the federal army, which was in the midst of its struggle with the Southern States in the War of the Rebellion. 

Of this voyage, Hughey has a fund of thrilling stories as well as many anecdotes. She liked to tell of the custom of Sunday evening prayers on deck at the sunset hour. Her father had a very good tenor voice, and as he led the hymns, his clear tones mingled with those of the others, the soft sounds of the water, together with the wonderful changing colors of the ocean, made a never-to-be effaced impression of the exquisite harmony of colors, music, parental and divine love, and to those influences Hughey attributed the beginning of what later has developed into her method of teaching music by the color system. 

Hughey's education had been rather out of the regular order. Owing to poor health she spent a part of her early life in the invalid's chair or bed, and much of her time when not suffering greatly from pain and weakness was occupied in developing some subject in which she was for the time especially interested. In this way she learned how to think, how to search for desired information, and how to express herself. 

At a very early age she showed great devotion to music and later became very fond of writing. Her studies during those years were carried on with frequent interruptions, which acted as a stimulus to her mental endeavor, either in private lessons with her father or small private schools; and she claimed that the intimate association with her teachers was a far better education than all the text books which she might have had. After a partial college course in the Western Seminary at Oxford, Ohio, she seemed drawn about equally toward a musical and literary career. Following a period of sickness were four years of great activity as a teacher of music in a private school in Philadelphia. During this time she also studied piano with William H. Sherwood, and later entered the musical conservatory of Ingham University at Le Roy, New York, which was the first woman's university in the United States. From there she went to Rochester, New York, to take a special course under Mrs. C. S. P. Gary, and the following year, 1880, graduated from the Lyons Musical Academy in Lyons, New York. 

The next season was spent in Boston studying musical composition and pipe organ with Whitney Eugene Thayer, and piano with William H. Sherwood. Such opportunities proved too great a temptation to her ambition and again she taxed her limited strength beyond endurance, and just as she was timidly bowing to possible success her health gave way and she was forced to abandon all hopes of concert life. 

While in Philadelphia she also studied composition with Dr. Hugh A. Clarke, and rhythmic law, melodic forms, kindergarten principles and practices and various philosophical deductions with Daniel Batcheller. Some of her associates there were Ida Waugh, the child painter; Fred Waugh, the landscape artist; Theodore Presser of the Etude, and others more or less known to fame. 

Hughey's fondness for analysis and enjoyment of a keen argument dates far back to earliest childhood when, oftentimes too weak to play, she would lie in her father's arms and listen to animated discussions with some visiting clergyman, lawyer or college professor; and those debates created a desire to know what is really true and right and to choose always the good in life.

Career
The first work in Missouri done by Hughey was in foreign missionary circles and for the Woman's Christian Temperance Union. Later when obliged to return to music teaching to help provide a home for a little son and daughter, she was surprised to find musical thought in the West not yet up to the 
advanced ideas which she had studied in the East before her marriage. 

The first attention attracted to Hughey's musical work in St. Louis was because of an unusual intelligence which became a characteristic of the playing of her pupils. Instead of being poor copyists of their teacher, they exhibited an ability to recognize the content of a musical work, and to acquire an independent, although correct expression of it. 

During this period her work in organizing and conducting the "study class" of the Union Musical Club attracted wide interest, the plan being copied by others in the National Federation of Musical Clubs, and the idea being written up by Eastern and Northern papers and magazines. This chairmanship was only resigned in order to take the presidency of the club; she is still giving practical aid to interests begun in that class. 

In 1905 the attention of music lovers was attracted to Hughey's article in the Etude, "Do I Teach My Pupils or Do They Teach Me?" for which she received the first prize in the contest for the best paper on practical teaching. This contribution won for the author many professional and other friends. 

Another article on Church Music, in which the writer unmercifully held up to view the possible disturbances caused by organs run by electricity, together with the sins and failings of the organist, choir singers, and music committees, aroused a lively interest and many comments — but through carelessness on the part of the printer the author's name was omitted and the editor of the organ department of the "Etude" had the unexpected pleasure of suffering for, as well as enjoying, the criticisms unfavorable and favorable. 

Hughey was chairman of the Sacred Music Committee of the National Federation of Music Clubs, and edited the column "Mothers, Babes and Music," in the "Musical Monitor" — the official organ of the national organization. 

Gradually through her lectures and writings she was recognized as a little ahead of her time, and the fact that her methods were generally adopted prove the practical value of her ideas. 

As a lecturer she was absolutely fearless, being perfectly at home on any platform, and expressing herself before the largest audiences with the greatest ease and fluency. She was wholly devoted to her profession, and the success of her efforts in musical and literary lines had been a source of 
commendation and approval to the music lovers of St. Louis. 

Hughey was a member of The Society of Colonial Daughters of the XVII Century, The National Society of Daughters of Founders and Patriots of America and Daughters of the American Revolution.

Color-Music system

Fannie E. McKinney Hughey conducted The Hughey Color-Music Model School for children from two to seven years of age, and normal training classes for mothers and teachers at the Milliken Conservatory of Music, Decatur, Illinois. Along with the musical training went instruction in number work, nature work, bodily exercise, and for the more advanced pupils languages were taught. The training school was for those who wish to learn the Hughey system, either for teaching or for home instruction.

Fannie E. McKinney Hughey's book on her method of teaching music by the color system, "Color Music for Children," which was published in 1912 by G. Schirmer, New York, was calculated for and addressed to babes and kindergarten pupils. As Hughey rightly observed: "Instruction began formerly with the adult's conception of things; the object being to impart this knowledge to the child. Modern methods begin with the child's experience, and the things which interest him, and broaden out to include the whole field of learning. A child's imagination is very active and sensitive; his power of imitation is just as keen. His world is made up of imagination and imitation. If we would have him love music and desire it, we must go to him where he is, rather than expect him to come to us with our grown-up ideas."

"If we would help him to think, feel, render and love music, we must teach him by imagery, mimicry and imagination. So we associate musical sounds with colors, making pictures for the eye and pictures for the ear, and in order to make the pictures definite and reasonable the colors are given the shapes of birds, because birds are not only pretty to look at but to listen to. Thus the little ones learn to write and render music as they "learn to paint a picture or compose a story."

The interesting part of Hughey's system is that she insisted it is best to begin music before a child is able to walk, in happy play with its mother. Little children, three, four and five years old, could learn music faster and more accurately and enjoy the study more than at any later period, provided they had the right start. A little child would hardly learn to love music when it is plumped down on a hard music stool, and watched by a severe instructress while stumbling through the scales and five-finger exercises, its eyes anxiously fixed on the guiding lead pencil. No wonder children looked upon it as a distasteful task, and conceive a lasting hatred for music lessons.

From earliest infancy children were attracted by colors; Hughey had simply taken advantage of this fact and developed a natural and logical system from it. A thorough test of the color method had been made before presenting it to the public, and the eagerness with which children took up the lessons, and their enthusiasm over the work, had amply demonstrated its practicability. By its means the drudgery attendant upon the first period of the child's musical studies was entirely eliminated.

Work became play; rapid progress was made in ear training, in accuracy in determining intervals, and in technic. In class work the color method was a fascinating process, the children vying with each other in eager endeavor.

The method could be adopted by the mother in the nursery for the instruction of her own children; any private student could use it with a small group of children belonging to the families of friends and neighbors as an amateur instructor, and the professional music and public school teacher could apply it to their regular classes.

The part played by color was easily grasped. Tonic, Dominant and Third were the three primary colors, red, blue and yellow, respectively; the second was Orange (red plus yellow); and the fourth was Green (blue plus yellow), the Octave light red; the sixth Violet (blue and light red), and the seventh Pink (violet and light red). Instead of these technical names for the scale degrees, the Tonic Sol-fa names doh, ray, me, fah, soh, lah, te, were used, and the colors were supposed to be brought down from Rainbow Land by beautiful, bright-hued birds with sweet, soft voices that sound the several tones. The Doh-bird came down first, then the Soh-bird, and so on. The children placed the tacks corresponding in color to the several birds on the appropriate "perches" (lines or spaces); they were taught to sing the tones in perfect tune and to point out the proper "nest" (piano-key) for each bird. All this was in the spirit of happy play and innocent rivalry.

Personal life
On July 19, 1888, Fannie McKinney married Rev. Albert Stinson Hughey (1856-1930) and they had two children: Albert S. Hughey Jr. and Florence Hughey.

She died in 1929 and is buried at Fort Hill Cemetery, Auburn, with her husband.

References

1857 births
1929 deaths
People from St. Louis
Educators from Missouri
American women educators